The Karren is a mountain within the city bounds of Dornbirn, in Western Austria. 

A cable car goes to the top of the mountain. The summit station includes a panorama restaurant with an expansive view of Switzerland and Germany and the Rhine Valley.

External links  
Karren cable car website

Mountains of Vorarlberg
Bregenz Forest Mountains
Mountains of the Alps